Fartha may refer to:

 Fartha, County Cavan, Ireland
 Fartha, County Cork, Ireland